Francis Crawford Burkitt  (3 September 1864 – 11 May 1935) was an English theologian. As Norris Professor of Divinity at the University of Cambridge from 1905 until shortly before his death, Burkitt was a sturdy critic of the notion of a distinct "Caesarean Text" of the New Testament put forward by B. H. Streeter and others.

Education and career

Burkitt was educated at Harrow School. He studied mathematics at Trinity College, Cambridge, graduating with a Bachelor of Arts (BA) degree in 1886: he was the 28th Wrangler that year. He then undertook the theological tripos and gained first-class honours in 1888. He received his Master of Arts (MA) in 1890. He was awarded both Bachelor of Divinity (BD) and Doctor of Divinity (DD) degrees in 1915.

From 1903 to 1905, he was a lecturer in palaeography at the University of Cambridge. He was Norrisian Professor of Divinity from 1905 to 1934, and then Norris–Hulse Professor of Divinity from 1934 until his death in 1935. In 1926, he was additionally elected a professorial fellow of Trinity College, Cambridge.

Burkitt accompanied Robert Bensly, James Rendel Harris, and sisters Agnes and Margaret Smith on the 1893 expedition to Saint Catherine's Monastery in Egypt to examine a Syriac palimpsest of the Gospels discovered there the previous year by the sisters. Burkitt played an important role in deciphering the text and in subsequent publication of the team's findings.

Burkitt was a noted figure at Cambridge in 1912–1935 for his chairmanship of the Cambridge New Testament Seminar, attended by other prominent theologians, including Robert Newton Flew, who left an account of it in an obituary for Burkitt in the Proceedings of the British Academy. He was also president of the Cambridge Philological Society from 1904 to 1905.  Burkitt was one of the founding member of the Cambridge Theological Society that was dedicated to research, and president from 1907-09.

Personal life
Burkitt married Amy Persis in 1888. Together, they had one son, Miles Crawford Burkitt, who went on to become an archaeologist and academic.

Burkitt died suddenly at his home on West Road, Cambridge on 11 May 1935, aged 70.

Honours
The Burkitt Medal, awarded by the British Academy, is named in his honour.

Works

Books

Edited by

Journal articles

References

External links

Biographical page

1864 births
1935 deaths
19th-century Anglican theologians
19th-century British biblical scholars
19th-century Christian biblical scholars
19th-century English Christian theologians
19th-century philologists
20th-century Anglican theologians
20th-century Christian biblical scholars
20th-century English theologians
20th-century philologists
Alumni of Trinity College, Cambridge
Anglican biblical scholars
English Anglican theologians
English biblical scholars
Fellows of the British Academy
Fellows of Trinity College, Cambridge
New Testament scholars
Norrisian Professors of Divinity
People educated at Harrow School
Syriacists
Norris–Hulse Professors of Divinity